The 2022–23 NCAA Division I women's ice hockey season began in September 2022 and will end with the 2023 NCAA National Collegiate Women's Ice Hockey Tournament's championship game at AMSOIL Arena in Duluth, Minnesota on March 19, 2023.

Polls

Regular season

Realignment 
The Stonehill Skyhawks are set to join the NEWHA for the 2022-23 season.

Standings

Player stats

Scoring leaders 
The following players lead the NCAA in points as of March 9, 2023.

Leading goaltenders 
The following goaltenders lead the NCAA in goals against average.

The following goaltenders lead the NCAA in goals against average. GP = Games played; Min = Minutes played; W = Wins; L = Losses; T = Ties; GA = Goals against; SO = Shutouts; SV% = Save percentage; GAA = Goals against average

NCAA Tournament

References 

2022–23 NCAA Division I women's hockey season
NCAA Division I women's ice hockey seasons